Komninades (before 1927: Σιάκι - Siaki) is a village in Kastoria Regional Unit, Western Macedonia, Greece.

Siaki was populated by Albanian speaking Muslim inhabitants and they used to intermarry with the nearby Muslim villages of Menkulas, Vidohovë and Miras (now in Albania). The Greek census (1920) recorded 690 people in the village and in 1923 there were 683 inhabitants (or 95 families) who were Muslim Albanians. Following the Greek-Turkish population exchange, the Muslim population of Siaki went to Turkey in 1924 and Anatolian Orthodox Christians settled in the village. In 1926, 69 refugee families from Pontus were in Siaki. The Greek census (1928) recorded 254 inhabitants. There were 67 refugee families (266 people) in 1928. After the population exchange, the site where the village mosque stood was replaced by the present church, the Assumption of the Virgin, built in 1931.

References

Populated places in Kastoria (regional unit)